The 1913–14 Football League season was Birmingham Football Club's 22nd in the Football League and their 14th in the Second Division. They finished in 14th position in the 20-team division. They also took part in the 1913–14 FA Cup, entering at the first round proper and losing to Southern League club Queens Park Rangers in the third round (last 16).

No fewer than thirty-five players made at least one appearance in nationally organised first-team competition, and there were twenty different goalscorers. Full-back Frank Womack played in 39 of the 41 matches over the season; only three other players exceeded 20 appearances. Andy Smith was leading scorer with 10 goals, all of which came in the league.

In November 1913, Birmingham captain Womack was offered an inducement of £55 to fix the result of the match against Grimsby Town. A similar offer was made to West Bromwich Albion captain Jesse Pennington in relation to their match against Everton. Both men reported the matter to club officials and the police, an arrest was made, and the culprit, one Pascoe Bioletti, who was connected with a football betting service based in Switzerland, was convicted and sentenced to five months' imprisonment in relation to Pennington. After his release, the charge in relation to Womack was withdrawn, as "the Football Association did not want to be vindictive as Bioletti was 68 years old."

Football League Second Division

League table (part)

FA Cup

Appearances and goals

Players with name struck through and marked  left the club during the playing season.

See also
Birmingham City F.C. seasons

References
General
 Matthews, Tony (1995). Birmingham City: A Complete Record. Breedon Books (Derby). .
 Matthews, Tony (2010). Birmingham City: The Complete Record. DB Publishing (Derby). .
 Source for match dates and results: "Birmingham City 1913–1914: Results". Statto Organisation. Retrieved 20 May 2012.
 Source for lineups, appearances, goalscorers and attendances: Matthews (2010), Complete Record, pp. 272–73. Note that attendance figures are estimated.
 Source for kit: "Birmingham City". Historical Football Kits. Retrieved 22 May 2018.

Specific

Birmingham City F.C. seasons
Birmingham